The Mastretta Unediseño (previously Unediseño Mastretta) was a kit-car coupé designed and manufactured by Mexican kit-car manufacturer Mastretta.

History
Unediseño was created around 1991 by Daniel Mastretta, Mexican designer and his brother Carlos and usually manufactures metropolitan peseros and buses.
However, Mastretta was interested in the world of kit-cars so he created his own car. He took the chassis of the popular Volkswagen Beetle and made a fibreglass body, with a similar design to that of the Chevrolet Corvette and the Ferrari 360.

This is the only car produced by Unediseño and was sold in Germany and in the United States.

Mastretta

Following the creation of the Mastretta MXT serial-production project, the previous Unediseño cars are now called Mastretta MXA and Mastretta MXB. Then, the Mastretta Unediseño may be considered Unediseño's first car, and the MXT, Mastretta's first car although they remain the same maker.

See also
Volkswagen Beetle

First car made by manufacturer
Kit cars
Cars of Mexico